Gingle may refer to:

Gingle Wang, actress and writer
Jingle (carriage)
Ringing Gingle Bells, Korean album